Sligo–Leitrim is a parliamentary constituency that has been represented in Dáil Éireann, the lower house of the Irish parliament or Oireachtas, from the 2016 general election. The constituency elects 4 deputies (Teachtaí Dála, commonly known as TDs) on the system of proportional representation by means of the single transferable vote (PR-STV). The constituency previously existed from 1923 to 1937 (then titled Leitrim–Sligo) and from 1948 to 2007.

History and boundaries

1923–1937 and 1948–2007
The constituency was defined in the Electoral Act 1923 as:
"The administrative counties of Leitrim and Sligo."

This was the first time that the Dáil had not used constituencies defined under British law. Leitrim–Sligo replaced the old Leitrim–Roscommon North and Sligo–Mayo East constituencies, which had been created under the Government of Ireland Act 1920. The constituency was first used at the 1923 general election.

Under the Electoral (Revision of Constituencies) Act 1935, the Leitrim–Sligo constituency was abolished, and replaced for the 1937 general election by two separate 3 seat constituencies: Sligo and Leitrim. The territory was reunited as Sligo–Leitrim under the Electoral (Amendment) Act 1947, in operation from the 1948 general election. The constituency was abolished at the 2007 general election, and replaced by two new constituencies: Roscommon–South Leitrim and Sligo–North Leitrim.

2016 onwards
The constituency was recreated following a recommendation of the Constituency Commission its 2012 report. The change was implemented by the Electoral (Amendment) (Dáil Constituencies) Act 2013. It replaced the constituencies of Roscommon–South Leitrim and Sligo–North Leitrim, and comprises all of County Sligo; all of County Leitrim; nine electoral divisions of southern County Donegal, and thirty-six electoral divisions of western County Cavan. It took effect at the 2016 general election.

This change proved controversial, and created an unusual cross-province constituency taking in all or parts of four counties. Some Cavan and Donegal voters felt unrepresented. One man shared a picture online of his spoiled ballot in the 2016 election, which read "I LIVE IN CAVAN!" Local newspaper The Anglo-Celt reported that several people had similarly spoiled their ballots, using the column of boxes to spell out the same message. At the 2020 general election, the electoral divisions in County Cavan were transferred to the Cavan–Monaghan constituency, and Sligo–Leitrim instead took in parts of Roscommon–Galway constituency.

The Electoral (Amendment) (Dáil Constituencies) Act 2017 defines the constituency as:

TDs

TDs 1923–1937

TDs 1948–2007

TDs since 2016

Elections

2020 general election

2016 general election

2002 general election

1997 general election

1992 general election

1989 general election

1987 general election

November 1982 general election
John Ellis topped the poll on the first count, but unusually he was not elected.

February 1982 general election

1981 general election

1977 general election

1973 general election

1969 general election

1965 general election

1961 general election

1961 by-election
Following the death of Fianna Fáil TD Stephen Flynn on 24 November 1960, a by-election was held on 1 March 1961.

1957 general election

1954 general election

1951 general election

1948 general election

1933 general election

1932 general election
The vote was delayed two weeks in Leitrim–Sligo due to the assassination of Patrick Reynolds TD two days before the election was to take place. His widow Mary took his place on the ballot and was elected.

1929 by-election
Following the death of Fianna Fáil TD Samuel Holt on 18 April 1929, a by-election was held on 7 June 1929.

September 1927 general election

June 1927 general election

1925 by-election
Following the resignations of Cumann na nGaedheal TDs Thomas Carter and Alexander McCabe on 30 October 1924, a by-election for both seats was held on 11 March 1925.

1923 general election

See also
Elections in the Republic of Ireland
Politics of the Republic of Ireland
List of Dáil by-elections
List of political parties in the Republic of Ireland

References

Dáil constituencies
Politics of County Sligo
Politics of County Leitrim
1948 establishments in Ireland
2007 disestablishments in Ireland
Constituencies established in 1948
Constituencies disestablished in 2007
2016 establishments in Ireland
Constituencies established in 2016